Fort William D. Davis is a former U.S. Army fort near Gatun, Panama. It was transferred to Panama in 1995.

Current use
Panama renamed the location Jose Dominador Bazan residential area. It is used for civilian housing, education and production facilities, including an established 400 seat international call center in operation since 2004. It is also the Panamanian National Police Training Academy grounds since 2014.

See also
 List of former United States military installations in Panama

References

External links
Historic American Buildings Survey (HABS) documentation, filed under Colon, Former Panama Canal Zone, CZ:

Davis, Fort Davis, Panama
Military installations closed in 1995
Davis, Fort Davis, Panama
Historic American Buildings Survey in the former Panama Canal Zone